Wallsend Racecourse is a former racecourse near the suburb of Wallsend, New South Wales, Australia.

The racecourse was sold in 1931.

References

Defunct horse racing venues in Australia
Newcastle, New South Wales